Kostas Karyotakis (11 November [OS October 30], 1896 – 20 July 1928) is considered one of the most representative Greek poets of the 1920s and one of the first poets to use iconoclastic themes in Greece. His poetry conveys a great deal of nature, imagery and traces of expressionism and surrealism. He also belongs to the Greek Lost Generation movement. The majority of Karyotakis' contemporaries viewed him in a dim light throughout his lifetime without a pragmatic accountability for their contemptuous views; for after his suicide, the majority began to revert to the view that he was indeed a great poet. He had a significant, almost disproportionately progressive influence on later Greek poets.

Biography 
Karyotakis gave existential depth as well as a tragic dimension to the emotional nuances and melancholic tones of the neo-Symbolist and new-Romantic poetry of the time. With a rare clarity of spirit and penetrating vision, he captures and conveys with poetic daring the climate of dissolution and the impasses of his generation, as well as the traumas of his own inner spiritual world.

Early life

Karyotakis was born in Tripoli, Greece, his father's occupation as a county engineer resulted in his early childhood and teenage years being spent in various places, following his family's successive moves around the Greek cities, including Argostoli, Lefkada, Larisa, Kalamata, Athens and Chania. He started publishing poetry in various magazines for children in 1912. It is solely rife speculation that he had felt deeply betrayed that a girl he had cared for in Hania in 1913 had married and sent him into melancholy.

After receiving his degree from the Athens School of Law and Political Sciences, in 1917, he did not pursue a career as a lawyer. Karyotakis became a clerk in the Prefecture of Thessaloniki. However, he greatly disliked his work and could not tolerate the bureaucracy of the state, which he wrote about often in his poems. His prose piece Catharsis ('purification') is characteristic of this. For this reason he would often be removed from his posts and transferred to other locations in Greece. During these removals he became familiar with the boredom and misery of the country during World War I.

Adulthood and career
In February 1919 he published his first collection of poetry: The Pain of People and of Things, which was largely ignored or badly reviewed by the critics. In the same year he published, with his friend Agis Levendis, a satirical review, called The Leg, which, despite its success, was banned by the police after the sixth issue. In 1921 he published his second collection called Nepenthe and also wrote a musical revue, Pell-Mell. In 1922 he began having an affair with the poet Maria Polydouri who was a colleague of his at the Prefecture of Attica. In 1923 he wrote a poem called "Treponema pallidum", which was published under the title "Song of Madness" and gave rise to speculation that he may have been suffering from syphilis, which before 1945 was considered a chronic illness with no proven cure for it.

George Skouras, a physician of the poet, wrote: "He was sick, he was syphilitic" and George Savidis (1929–1999), professor of the Aristotle University of Thessaloniki, who possessed the largest archive about Greek poets, revealed that Karyotakis was syphilitic, and that his brother, Thanasis Karyotakis, thought the disease to be a disgrace to the family. In 1924 he traveled abroad, visiting Italy and Germany. In December 1927 he published his last collection of poetry: Elegy and Satires. In February 1928, Karyotakis was transferred to Patras although soon afterwards he spent a month on leave in Paris and in June 1928 he was sent yet again to Preveza by ship.

Suicide

Karyotakis lived in Preveza only for 33 days, until his suicide on 21 July 1928 at age 31. His work was in Prefecture of Preveza, in the Palios mansion, 10 Speliadou street, as a lawyer for control for land donations from State to refugees from the Asia Minor War of 1922. From Preveza he sent desperate letters to friends and relatives describing the misery he felt in the town. His family offered to  support him for an indefinite stay in Paris, but he refused knowing what a monetary sacrifice like this would entail for them. His angst is felt in the poem "Preveza" which he wrote shortly before his suicide. The poem displays an insistent, lilting anaphora on the word Death, which stands at the beginning of several lines and sentences.

It is shot through with a pungent awareness of the gallows, in the tiny mediocrity of life as Karyotakis felt it, mortality is measured against insignificant, black, pecking birds, or the town policeman checking a disputed weight, or identified with futile street names (boasting the date of battles), or the brass band on Sunday, a trifling sum of cash in a bank book, the flowers on a balcony, a teacher reading his newspaper, the prefect coming in by ferry: "If only," mutters the last of these six symmetrical quatrains, "one of those men would fall dead out of disgust".

On 19 July 1928, Karyotakis went to Monolithi beach and kept trying to drown in the sea for ten hours, but failed in his attempt, because he was an avid swimmer as he himself wrote in his suicide note. In the subsequent morning he returned home and left again to purchase a revolver and went to a little café in the place Vryssoula (near today Hotel Zikas). After smoking for a few hours, and drinking cherry juice, he left 75 drachmas as a gratuity, while the cost of the drink was 5 drachmas, he went to Agios Spyridon, where, under a eucalyptus tree, he shot himself through the heart. His suicide letter was found in his pocket:

"It is time for me to reveal my tragedy. My greatest faults were unbridled curiosity, a diseased imagination, and my attempts to become acquainted with every emotion without being able to feel most of them. However, I despise the base act that is attributed to me. I experienced but the ideation of its atmosphere, the ultimate bitterness. Nor am I the suitable person for that profession. My entire past will show that much. Every reality to me was repulsive.

I felt the rush brought on by danger. And with glad heart I shall accept the coming danger.

P.S. And, to change the tone: I advise those who can swim never to try to commit suicide in the sea. All night and for ten hours I was battered by the waves. I drank much water but, by and again and without me knowing how, my mouth would surface. Perhaps some time, given the opportunity, I shall write down the impressions of a drowning man."

One of his most famous poems is "Preveza", about the place where he committed suicide.
Death is the bullies bashing
against the black walls and roof tiling,
death is the women being loved
as if onion peeling.

Death the squalid, unimportant streets
with their glamorous and pompous names,
the olive-grove, the surrounding sea, and even
the sun, death among all other deaths.

...

If at least, among these people,
one would die of sheer disgust
silent, bereaved, with humble manners, 
at the funeral we'd all have fun.

Works

Poems and collections 
Xeprovodisma (1919) published in «Noumas» (638)
When you Came... (1919) published in «Noumas» (650)
Your Letters (1920) published in «Noumas» (671)
The Pain of Men and Things (1919)
Nepenthe (1921)
Song (1922)  published in  «Pharos» (82)
Lycabettus ( 1922) published in «Noumas» (765)
Treponema pallidum (1923) published in «New Life» (322)
the Ash beyond the Horizon... (1923)) published in «Noumas» (771)
Varium et Mutabile (1923)) published in «Easter Anthology, 1923 (together with one of his friends Agis Leventis).
Escape (1923) published in «New Life» (324)
Prepare (1923) published in «Espero» (3)
Elegies and Satires (1927) published by printing press "Αthena"
Optimism (1929) [Posthumously] «Nea Estia» (6, 63)
Sunday (1929) [Posthumously] published in «Pnoe» (1)
Preveza (1930) [Posthumously] published in «Nea Estia» (8, 88)
When we get down the stairs... (1933) [Posthumously] published in «Beginnings» (7, July 1933)

Translations 
1. Elegias e Sátiras/Ελεγεία και Σάτιρες, Théo de Borba Mossburger (Trans.),  (n.t.) Revista Literária em Tradução, nº 1 (set/2010), Fpolis/Brasil, ISSN 2177-5141

Notes and references

Sources 
 
 
 
 
 
  </ref>

External links 
 Tribute to Kostas Karyotakis
 

Greek poets
Modern Greek poets
Expressionist writers
Suicides by firearm in Greece
Greek surrealist writers
1896 births
1928 suicides
Preveza
People from Tripoli, Greece
20th-century Greek people
20th-century Greek poets
1928 deaths